The 2022 Vietnam Open (officially known as the Yonex-Sunrise Vietnam Open 2022 for sponsorship reasons) was a badminton tournament which took place at Nguyen Du Cultural Sports Club in Ho Chi Minh City, Vietnam, from 27 September to 2 October 2022 and had a total purse of $75,000.

Tournament 
The 2022 Vietnam Open was the third Super 100 tournament of the 2022 BWF World Tour and also part of the Vietnam Open championships, which had been held since 1996. This tournament was organized by the Vietnam Badminton Association and sanctioned by the BWF.

Venue 
This international tournament was held at Nguyen Du Cultural Sports Club in Ho Chi Minh City, Vietnam.

Point distribution 
Below is the point distribution table for each phase of the tournament based on the BWF points system for the BWF Tour Super 100 event.

Prize pool 
The total prize money was US$75,000 with the distribution of the prize money in accordance with BWF regulations.

Men's singles

Seeds 

 Kanta Tsuneyama (withdrew)
 B. Sai Praneeth (second round)
 Kodai Naraoka (champion)
 Tommy Sugiarto (second round)
 Parupalli Kashyap (withdrew)
 Weng Hongyang (semi-finals)
 Soong Joo Ven (second round)
 Mithun Manjunath (second round)

Finals

Top half

Section 1

Section 2

Bottom half

Section 3

Section 4

Women's singles

Seeds 

 Aya Ohori (quarter-finals)
 Saina Nehwal (withdrew)
 Putri Kusuma Wardani (withdrew)
 Ruselli Hartawan (quarter-finals)
 Kisona Selvaduray (quarter-finals)
 Nguyễn Thùy Linh (champion)
 Goh Jin Wei (final)
 Ashmita Chaliha (withdrew)

Finals

Top half

Section 1

Section 2

Bottom half

Section 3

Section 4

Men's doubles

Seeds 

 Sabar Karyaman Gutama / Muhammad Reza Pahlevi Isfahani (semi-finals)
 He Jiting / Zhou Haodong (final)
 Junaidi Arif / Muhammad Haikal (semi-finals)
 Ren Xiangyu / Tan Qiang (champions)
 Mahiro Kaneko / Keigo Sonoda (quarter-finals)
 Wahyu Nayaka / Hardianto (second round)
 Weeraphat Phakjarung / Wongsathorn Thongkham (first round)
 Andy Kwek / Loh Kean Hean (second round)

Finals

Top half

Section 1

Section 2

Bottom half

Section 3

Section 4

Women's doubles

Seeds  

 Benyapa Aimsaard / Nuntakarn Aimsaard (champions)
 Febriana Dwipuji Kusuma / Amalia Cahaya Pratiwi (final)
 Jin Yujia / Crystal Wong (semi-finals)
 Simran Singhi / Ritika Thaker (withdrew)
 Lanny Tria Mayasari / Ribka Sugiarto (second round)
 Nita Violina Marwah / Tryola Nadia (quarter-finals)
 Riko Imai / Maiko Kawazoe (quarter-finals)
 Sanyogita Ghorpade / Priya Konjengbam (withdrew)

Finals

Top half

Section 1

Section 2

Bottom half

Section 3

Section 4

Mixed doubles

Seeds 

 Rehan Naufal Kusharjanto / Lisa Ayu Kusumawati (final)
 Zachariah Josiahno Sumanti / Hediana Julimarbela (semi-finals)
 Chan Peng Soon / Cheah Yee See (quarter-finals)
 Dejan Ferdinansyah / Gloria Emanuelle Widjaja (champions)
 Muhammad Reza Pahlevi Isfahani / Melati Daeva Oktavianti (quarter-finals)
 Low Juan Shen / Goh Liu Ying (quarter-finals)
 Chang Tak Ching / Lui Lok Lok (quarter-finals)
 Yeung Shing Choi / Fan Ka Yan (second round)

Finals

Top half

Section 1

Section 2

Bottom half

Section 3

Section 4

References

External links 
Tournament link

Vietnam Open (badminton)
Vietnam Open
Vietnam Open (badminton)
Sport in Ho Chi Minh City
Vietnam Open (badminton)
Vietnam Open (badminton)